The Dalek Contract / The Final Phase is a 4-part Big Finish Productions audio drama coverings 2 story-arcs based on the long-running British science fiction television series Doctor Who.

The Dalek Contract
The Doctor and Romana find themselves in the Proxima System, where enigmatic Conglomerate CEO Cuthbert has been conducting his infamous 'experiment'. An experiment which might accidentally rip the universe apart.

Meanwhile, living conditions on Proxima Major have become harsh and hostile. Climate change has turned the landscape into a freezing wasteland and an alien power has condemned much of the population to life inside internment camps. For those still clinging to their freedom, the struggle for survival is now beyond desperate and outsiders such as the Doctor and Romana are only seen as a threat.

The Final Phase
Cuthbert's plan for the Proxima System is reaching its final phase.

The Doctor and Romana have been separated. The Doctor is aiding the Proximan fight-back. Romana and K9 are prisoners of the Daleks.

And as the countdown to the opening of the Quantum Gateway begins, the Daleks reveal their true intentions.

Cast
The Doctor – Tom Baker
Romana – Mary Tamm
K9 – John Leeson
Dalek Voices / Dalek Supreme Voice – Nicholas Briggs
Cuthbert – David Warner
Mr Dorrick – Toby Hadoke
Chidak – Dominic Mafham
Halka – Jane Slavin
Security Man / Warrior – John Dorney

Notes

External links
Big Finish Productions – The Dalek Contract
Big Finish Productions – The Final Phase

2013 audio plays
Fourth Doctor audio plays
Dalek audio plays